Shishman Mitsev (born 20 August 1937) is a Bulgarian boxer. He competed in the men's welterweight event at the 1960 Summer Olympics.

References

1937 births
Living people
Bulgarian male boxers
Olympic boxers of Bulgaria
Boxers at the 1960 Summer Olympics
Welterweight boxers